Carlos Graeff (born September 1, 1947) is a Mexican sprint canoer who competed from the late 1960s. He was eliminated in the repechages of the K-4 1000 m event at the 1968 Summer Olympics in Mexico City.

References
Sports-reference.com profile

1947 births
Canoeists at the 1968 Summer Olympics
Living people
Mexican male canoeists
Olympic canoeists of Mexico
Sportspeople from Mexico City
Place of birth missing (living people)
20th-century Mexican people